Walnut Hill is the name of several locations in the United States:

Settlements
 Walnut Hill, Florida, a community in northern Escambia County, Florida
 Walnut Hill, Illinois, a village
 Walnut Hill, Medford, Massachusetts, a neighborhood
 Walnut Hill (Omaha), an historic neighborhood in Omaha, Nebraska
 Walnut Hill, Philadelphia, Pennsylvania, a neighborhood
 Walnut Hill, Tennessee, a census-designated place
 Walnut Hill, West Virginia, an unincorporated community

Other uses
 Walnut Hill (Lynchburg, Virginia), a historic house
 Walnut Hill School, an arts-focused private school in Natick, Massachusetts
 Walnut Hill station (disambiguation), stations of the name

See also 
 Walnut Hills (disambiguation)